Solar power is a growing source in the Portuguese energy mix. At the end of 2020, solar power installed capacity totalled 1.03 GW and represented 3.6% of total power generation in 2020.

Portugal has set a goal of between 8.1 GW and 9.9 GW in installed capacity by 2030.

Photovoltaic Plants

The Serpa solar power plant is an 11 megawatt plant covered  and employs 52,000 PV panels. The panels are raised 2 meters off the ground thus allowing grazing to continue. The plant provides enough energy for 8,000 homes and saves an estimated 30,000 tonnes of carbon dioxide emissions per year.

On 9 October 2021, the largest solar power plant in Portugal was inaugurated in Alcoutim. With an installed capacity of 219 MW, the power plant has 661,500 solar panels and can power the needs of 200,000 homes. It occupies an area of 320 hectares and will prevent the emission of 326,000 tons of carbon dioxide every year. It surpassed the 62 MW Moura Photovoltaic Power Station.

Recent and future auctions 
In 2019, a competitive auction for a new PV plant saw a worldwide record low bid of €14.76 per MWh, well below other generating technologies. The auction awarded 1.150 MW of solar capacity to various companies, significantly more than the total installed capacity at the time. A 2020 auction saw a price of €11.16 per MWh.

Solar power interest is growing exponentially in Portugal. João Galamba, the State Secretary for Energy, announced that more solar auctions would take place, including one in the second quarter of 2020 as well as that there were over 80,000 MW (80 GW) in projects awaiting analysis and approval.

Another solar auction is set to launch between October 2021 and November 2021. A total of 400 MW in floating solar power at dam reservoirs will be auctioned.

Rooftop solar 
In addition to tenders for large scale power plants, Portugal has set a framework for the installation of small scale rooftop solar installations which came into force in January 2020.

Floating Solar Power 
In November 2016, an EDP Group pilot-project of 840 solar panels with a total capacity of 200 kWp began to produce power on the reservoir of the Alto Rabagão dam with an annual production of 300 MWh.

At the end of 2021, a floating solar power project at the Alqueva Dam reservoir is set to begin production. 12,000 solar panels with a total capacity of 4 MW will produce 7 GWh of power annually.

Total installed photovoltaics

See also

Renewable energy in Portugal
Wind power in Portugal
Geothermal power in Portugal
List of renewable energy topics by country
Renewable energy in the European Union

References

External links
Solar power in Portugal